Kõmsi is a village in Lääneranna Parish, Pärnu County, in western Estonia.

Archbishop of the Evangelical Lutheran Church of Estonia, Andres Põder (born 1949), was born in Kõmsi.

References

 

Villages in Pärnu County